Tennyson is an unincorporated community in southeastern Coke County, Texas, United States.  It lies along U.S. Route 277 southeast of the city of Robert Lee, the county seat of Coke County.  Its elevation is 1,883 ft (574 m).  Although Tennyson is unincorporated, it has a post office, with the ZIP code of 76953; the ZCTA for ZIP code 76953 had a population of 64 at the 2000 census.

Named for Alfred, Lord Tennyson by an English settler who arrived in 1882, the community received a post office in 1892.  Tennyson began to grow after the Kansas City, Mexico and Orient Railway was built through the area in 1910, but it began to shrink when its local cotton farming economy shrank in the 1920s.

References

External links
Profile of Tennyson from Handbook of Texas Online

Unincorporated communities in Coke County, Texas
Unincorporated communities in Texas
Alfred, Lord Tennyson